The Roy Doty Show was a Sunday morning DuMont Television Network children's TV show hosted by Roy Doty (1922–2015). The show aired from May 10, 1953, to October 4, 1953. Cartoonist Roy Doty drew cartoons and sketches and told children's stories.

Episode status
As with many DuMont series, no copies of the episodes are known to exist.

See also
List of programs broadcast by the DuMont Television Network
List of surviving DuMont Television Network broadcasts
Daytime television in the United States

References

Bibliography
David Weinstein, The Forgotten Network: DuMont and the Birth of American Television (Philadelphia: Temple University Press, 2004) 
Alex McNeil, Total Television, Fourth edition (New York: Penguin Books, 1980) 
Tim Brooks and Earle Marsh, The Complete Directory to Prime Time Network TV Shows, Third edition (New York: Ballantine Books, 1964)

External links
CTVA entry
DuMont historical website

DuMont Television Network original programming
1953 American television series debuts
1953 American television series endings
1950s American children's television series
Black-and-white American television shows
Works about visual art
Television shows about comics
Documentary television series about art
Lost television shows